Isopimaric acid (IPA) is a toxin which acts as a large conductance Ca2+-activated K+ channel (BK channel) opener.

Sources

IPA originates from many sorts of trees, especially conifers.

Chemistry

IPA is one of the members of the resin acid group and it is a tricyclic diterpene.

Target

IPA acts on the large-conductance calcium activated K+ channels (BK channels).

Mode of action

BK channels are formed by α subunits and accessory β subunits arranged in tetramers.  The α subunit forms the ion conduction pore and the β subunit contributes to channel gating. IPA interaction with the BK channel enhances Ca2+ and / or voltage sensitivity of the α subunit of BK channels without affecting the channel conductance. In this state BK channels can still be inhibited by one of their inhibitors, like charybdotoxin (CTX). Opening of the BK channel leads to an increased K+-efflux which hyperpolarizes the resting membrane potential, reducing the excitability of the cell in which the BK-channel is expressed.

Toxicity

Studies on rainbow trout hepatocytes have shown that IPA increases intracellular calcium release, leading to a disturbance in the calcium homeostasis. This could be important in the possible toxicity of the toxin.

See also
 Pimaric acid

Notes

References
 
 
	

Ion channel toxins
Carboxylic acids
Diterpenes
Non-protein ion channel toxins
Potassium channel openers
Phenanthrenes
Vinyl compounds